Pelforth–Sauvage–Lejeune was a French professional cycling team that existed from 1960 to 1968. Jan Janssen won the 1968 Tour de France with the team.

References

External links

Defunct cycling teams based in France
1960 establishments in France
1968 disestablishments in France
Cycling teams established in 1960
Cycling teams disestablished in 1968